Martin Holek (born 29 May 1989) is a Czech football player who currently plays for FK Blansko. He has represented his country at under-19 level.

References

External links
 
 Profile at iDNES.cz

Czech footballers
Czech expatriate footballers
1989 births
Living people
FK Ústí nad Labem players
1. FC Slovácko players
MFK Karviná players
SV Wacker Burghausen players
FK Baník Sokolov players
FK Blansko players
SpVgg Bayern Hof players
Regionalliga players
Czech First League players
Czech National Football League players
Association football forwards
Czech expatriate sportspeople in Germany
Expatriate footballers in Germany